Krzysztof Piskorski (born 1982) is a Polish fantasy and science fiction writer. His books Cienioryt (2013) and Czterdzieści i cztery (2016) won the Janusz A. Zajdel Award. Piskorski has also worked in the board game industry, writing story elements and co-designing several board games by Polish game company Awaken Realms.

Works

Books
 Wygnaniec (Runa 2005)
 Najemnik (Runa 2006)
 Prorok (Runa 2007)
 Poczet dziwów miejskich (Fabryka Słów 2007)
 Zadra, tome 1 (Runa 2008)
 Zadra, tome 2 (Runa 2009)
 Krawędź czasu (Runa 2011)
 Cienioryt (Wydawnictwo Literackie 2013)
 Czterdzieści i cztery (Wydawnictwo Literackie 2016)

Board Games
 The Edge: Dawnfall (2018)
 Tainted Grail: The Fall of Avalon (2019)
 ISS Vanguard (2021)

References

1982 births
Polish fantasy writers
Polish science fiction writers
Living people